Diran Chrakian (1875, in Constantinople, Ottoman Empire – 1921) was an Armenian poet, writer, painter and teacher, and a victim of Armenian genocide.

Biography 
Diran Chrakian (alt spelling: Tcharakian) was educated at Berberian College of Constantinople, then finished the College of Arts, where his works were appreciated by the famous painter Hovhannes Aivazovsky. Indra worked as a teacher, wrote articles, literary researches and notes. He signed his books "Inner World" (Ներաշխարհ, essays, 1906) and "Cypress Wood" (Նոճաստան, sonnets 1908), with the pseudonym Indra (anagram of his first name).

He became a prominent member of the Seventh-day Adventist church in the Ottoman Empire, having joined the church in 1913.

After the genocide of 1915, he was forced on a 1,000 kilometre death march. He died on the banks of the river Tigris at Diyarbakır in 1921.

Notes

Sources
Ցեղին սիրտը Western Armenian poetry, Yerevan, Arevik publ., 1991, p. 705 (biography in Armenian)
The Heritage of Armenian Literature: Volume III—From the Eighteenth Century to Modern Times, Edited by Agop J. Hacikyan, Edward S. Franchuk, Nourhan Ouzounian, and Gabriel Basmajian

1875 births
1921 deaths
20th-century Armenian poets
People who died in the Armenian genocide
Writers from Istanbul
Artists from Istanbul
Armenians from the Ottoman Empire
20th-century Armenian painters
Armenian Seventh-day Adventists
Converts to Adventism
Armenian male poets
20th-century male writers